Bayview is a small residential neighbourhood in the southwest quadrant of Calgary, Alberta, Canada. It is located on a peninsula on the southern shore of Glenmore Reservoir. One of the lake's two marinas is located in this community.

Bayview was established in 1967. It is represented in the Calgary City Council by the Ward 11 councillor

History 
Bayview was developed by Alcan Design Homes, a subsidiary of Alcan. All homes were design by Alcan, and Shirley C. Ireland of Colleen Interiors assisted buyers with interior decoration. The first lot in Bayview, 1924 Bay Shore, was sold to Bill Dickie. Homes were ready for occupancy in January 1968. The predominant architectural style is American Colonial, although there are also Spanish, Tudor, and Modern homes. All houses have front garages and there are no laneways.

Demographics

It is one of Calgary's wealthiest communities, with residents having a median household income of $184,383 in 2000 (the highest in the city). As of 2000, 15.1% of the residents were immigrants. All buildings were single-family detached homes, and none of the housing was used for renting.

Education
The community is served by Nellie McClung Elementary and John Ware Junior High public schools as well as by the St. Benedict Elementary (catholic), none of which are actually located within Bayview itself.

Commercial
The Glenmore Landing strip mall shopping centre is located off the southeast corner of the community and is its closest retail operation.

See also
List of neighbourhoods in Calgary

References

External links
Palliser-Pump Hill-Bayview Community Association

Neighbourhoods in Calgary